Deh Nasar (also Romanized as De Nasār) is a village in Sepiddasht Rural District, Papi District, Khorramabad County, Lorestan Province, Iran. At the 2006 census, its population was 179, in 34 families.

References 

Towns and villages in Khorramabad County